is a Japanese actress.

Regular roles

External links
(ja) Tajima, Honami-Central G. Production

Japanese actresses
1988 births
Living people